The following are the national records in Olympic weightlifting in India. Records are maintained in each weight class for the snatch lift, clean and jerk lift, and the total for both lifts by the Indian Weightlifting Federation (IWLF).

Current records
Key to tables:

Men

Women

Historical records

Men (1998–2018)

Women (1998–2018)

References
General
Indian records 3 August 2022 updated
Specific

External links
IWLF web site

records
India
Olympic weightlifting
weightlifting